Intercellular adhesion molecule 2 (ICAM2), also known as CD102 (Cluster of Differentiation 102), is a human gene, and the protein resulting from it.

Protein structure
The protein encoded by this gene is a member of the intercellular adhesion molecule (ICAM) family. All ICAM proteins are type I transmembrane glycoproteins, contain 2–9 immunoglobulin-like C2-type domains, and bind to the leukocyte adhesion LFA-1 protein.

Protein functions
ICAM-2 molecules regulate spermatid adhesion on Sertoli cell on the apical side of the blood-testis barrier (towards the lumen), thus playing a major role in spermatogenesis.

This protein may also play a role in lymphocyte recirculation by blocking LFA-1-dependent cell adhesion. It mediates adhesive interactions important for antigen-specific immune response, NK-cell mediated clearance, lymphocyte recirculation, and other cellular interactions important for immune response and surveillance.

Interactions 

ICAM2 has been shown to interact with EZR. It has also been shown to bind to P9 (Uniprot: B2UM07), a secreted protein from Akkermansia muciniphila.

See also 
 Cluster of differentiation

References

Further reading

External links 
 
 PDBe-KB provides an overview of all the structure information available in the PDB for Human Intercellular adhesion molecule 2  (ICAM2)

Clusters of differentiation